Ilirneyite is a rare tellurate mineral with the formula Mg0.5[ZnMn3+(TeO3)3]•4.5H2O. It was discovered at the Sentyabr'skoe deposit (of silver and gold) in the Ilirney Range, Western Chukotka, Russia.

Relation to other minerals
Ilirneyite is a trivalent-manganese-analogue of zemannite. It is also a zinc- and manganese-analogue of keystoneite and kinichilite.

External links
 Ilirneyite on Mindat:

References

Tellurate and selenate minerals
Magnesium minerals
Zinc minerals
Manganese(III) minerals
Hexagonal minerals
Minerals in space group 176
Minerals described in 2018